Mohammad Syamer bin Kutty Abba (born 1 Octocber 1997) is a Malaysian professional footballer who plays as a midfielder for Malaysia Super League side Johor Darul Ta'zim and the Malaysia national team. He mainly plays as a box-to-box midfielder. He was known for his strength, stamina, ball control and killer pass . He is one of the Malaysian golden generation in this era along Safawi Rasid and Nor Azam Azih

He was born into a Malabari family at Kampung Dodol, George Town, Penang. He went to Penang Free School.

Mohammad Syamer Kutty Abba is a name mainly known to those with a strong interest in Malaysian football. Having made his Malaysia debut against Hong Kong (China PR) in October 2017, he has gone on to make more than 20 appearances for his country. Mohammad Syamer Kutty Abba began his career at Penang in 2014. He moved to Harimau Muda C in December 2014.

His spell at Harimau Muda C didn't last long and in December 2015 he rejoined Penang, making 25 league appearances in 2 years. In November 2017 he joined Johor Darul Ta'zim, making 30 league appearances. During this time he also spent time on loan at Vilaverdense.

Club career

Harimau Muda C
Syamer began his senior career playing in FAM League, representing Harimau Muda C in the 2014 Malaysia FAM League.

Penang
Since Harimau Muda has disbanded by FAM which means all the player from Harimau Muda A, Harimau Muda B and Harimau Muda C has to returned to their own state. Syamer are with Penang FA for the Penang U21, before being promoted to first team in year 2016 to play in the top division of Malaysian football, the Malaysia Super League.

Johor Darul Ta'zim
On 18 November 2017, Syamer signed a contract with Johor Darul Ta'zim.

In late January 2018, it was announced that Syamer was loaned out to Portuguese third division club Vilaverdense on 27 January for a year-long loan stint alongside Dominic Tan, a fellow player from Johor Darul Ta'zim. But it was confirmed in early May that his stay would be a lot shorter than planned. An article by FOX Sports Asia concluded that he would return to Johor in June 2018, only having been on loan for six months.

International career

Syamer represented Malaysia at youth levels, playing for the under-17, -19, -20 and -23 levels.

In  October 2017, Syamer received his first call-up to the Malaysia national team for the centralised training as a preparation for 2019 Asian Cup qualifiers Group B match against Hong Kong on 10 October 2017.

Syamer made his debut for Malaysia  against Hong Kong in a 2–0 defeat on the 2019 Asian Cup qualifiers.

On 4 November 2018, he was named in the Malaysian national team for the 2018 AFF Championship.

Syamer is also part of the Malaysian team that qualified for the 2023 AFC Asian Cup and played  all 3 matches against Turkmenistan, Bahrain and Bangladesh in Third Round Group E Qualification.

Career statistics

Club

International

International goals

Honours

Club
Johor Darul Ta'zim
Malaysia Cup: 2019
Malaysia Super League: 2018, 2019, 2020
Malaysia Charity Shield: 2019

International
Malaysia
 AFF Championship runner-up: 2018

Malaysia U-23
Southeast Asian Games  Silver Medal: 2017

Individual
 AFF Best XI: 2019

References

1997 births
Living people
Malaysian footballers
People from Penang
Malaysian people of Indian descent
Malaysian people of Malayali descent
Penang F.C. players
Malaysia Super League players
Association football forwards
Southeast Asian Games silver medalists for Malaysia
Southeast Asian Games medalists in football
Malaysian expatriate footballers
Competitors at the 2017 Southeast Asian Games
Competitors at the 2019 Southeast Asian Games
Malaysia international footballers
Malaysia youth international footballers